Bangs High School is a public high school located in Bangs, Texas, and classified as a 3A school by the UIL. It is part of the Bangs Independent School District located in western Brown County. In 2015, the school was rated "Met Standard" by the Texas Education Agency.

Athletics
The Bangs Dragons compete in these sports - 

Baseball
Basketball
Cross Country
Football
Golf
Powerlifting
Softball
Tennis
Track and Field
Volleyball

State Titles
Boys Track 
1954(B), 1960(B)

State Finalists
Football  
2002(2A/D1), 2003(2A/D2)

Academics
From 2014–2017, Bangs High School has won their district UIL Academic Meet contest.

State Finalist/Titles

State Congress
2017
Current Events
4th place, 2017
Ready Writing
State Champion, 2017
One Act Play
State Second-Runner Up, 2017

References

External links
Bangs ISD

Public high schools in Texas
Brown